Dancing with the Stars is a first season on BBTV Channel 7 in Thailand. The show is the Thai version of the British television series Strictly Come Dancing. Sornram Teppitak, Thai actor and Thai pop singer, hosts with co-host Morakot Kittisara, Miss Thailand Universe 2004.

Couples
The names of seventh returning celebrities were revealed on December 17, 2012.

Scoring chart

Red numbers indicate the lowest score for each week.
 Green numbers indicate the highest score for each week.
 indicates the couple (or couples) eliminated that week.
 indicates the returning couple that finished in the bottom two (or bottom three).
 indicates the returning couple that was the last to be called safe (they may or may have not been in the bottom two or three).
 indicates the winning couple.
 indicates the runner-up couple.
 indicates the third-place couple.
 indicates the couple withdrew.
 indicates a couple that was eliminated in a dance-off.

Averages

Styles, scores and songs

Week 1 
 Individual judges' scores in the chart below (given in parentheses) are listed in this order from left to right: Manaswee Kridtanukul, Amon Chatpaisal, Tinakorn Asvarak

Running order

Week 2 
 Individual judges' scores in the chart below (given in parentheses) are listed in this order from left to right: Manaswee Kridtanukul, Amon Chatpaisal, Tinakorn Asvarak

Running order

Week 3 
 Individual judges' scores in the chart below (given in parentheses) are listed in this order from left to right: Manaswee Kridtanukul, Amon Chatpaisal, Tinakorn Asvarak

Running order

Week 4 
 Individual judges' scores in the chart below (given in parentheses) are listed in this order from left to right: Manaswee Kridtanukul, Amon Chatpaisal, Tinakorn Asvarak

Running order

Week 5 
 Individual judges' scores in the chart below (given in parentheses) are listed in this order from left to right: Manaswee Kridtanukul, Amon Chatpaisal, Tinakorn Asvarak

Running order

Week 6 Show 1 
 Individual judges' scores in the chart below (given in parentheses) are listed in this order from left to right: Manaswee Kridtanukul, Amon Chatpaisal, Tinakorn Asvarak

Running order

Week 6 Show 2 
 Individual judges' scores in the chart below (given in parentheses) are listed in this order from left to right: Manaswee Kridtanukul, Amon Chatpaisal, Tinakorn Asvarak

Running order

Week 7 
 Individual judges' scores in the chart below (given in parentheses) are listed in this order from left to right: Manaswee Kridtanukul, Amon Chatpaisal, Tinakorn Asvarak

Running order (Night 1)

Dance chart

 Highest scoring dance
 Lowest scoring dance
  Not performed due to illness

The dances performed during Series 1 were as follows:
Week 1 : Open show (Freestyle)
Week 2 : Cha Cha Cha or Waltz
Week 3 : Quickstep or Rumba
Week 4 : Jive or Tango
Week 5 : Paso Doble or Foxtrot
Week 6 : Samba & Viennese Waltz
Week 7 : Paso Doble & Freestyle

Thai
2013 Thai television seasons